Gender & Development is a peer-reviewed journal published triannually by Routledge and Oxfam to provide "promote, inspire, and support development policy and practice." The editor-in-chief is Caroline Sweetman (Oxfam, GB).

'Virtual' issue 
A special ‘virtual’ issue of the journal on Intersecting Inequalities was created for the International Symposium on Gender and Intersectionality, convened by Oxfam and The Center for Gender in Organizations, Simmons School of Management, Boston Massachusetts (23-24 March 2015).

References

External links 
 

English-language journals
Development studies journals
Gender studies journals
Publications established in 1993
Routledge academic journals
Triannual journals